PSV Garuda Vega is a 2017 Indian Telugu-language action spy thriller film written and directed by Praveen Sattaru. The film is produced by M. Koteswara Raju and stars Rajasekhar, Pooja Kumar, Adith Arun, Shraddha Das, and Kishore,  while Sanjay Reddy, Nassar, Ali, Posani Krishna Murali, and Sayaji Shinde play supporting roles. The film was released worldwide on 3 November 2017 and received positive reviews and emerged as a commercial success at the box office.

Plot 
Niranjan Iyer, a hacker, makes a deal for confidential information worth  with an unknown person. When he confirms the deal, someone chases after him, but Niranjan manages to escape. Pullela Chandrasekhar, an ACP of the NIA and his wife Swathi, consult a divorce lawyer. Swathi accuses Shekhar of neglecting her and their son and only focusing on his work. Shekhar gets into a car crash when he returns to his office. He finds a high range gun in the other car, which is rare in India, and the other car's owner escapes by shooting Shekhar. 

Shekhar decides to arrest the car owner and orders his assistant to check traffic signal CCTV footage to find him. He discovers that the owner is the seasoned assassin named Yakub Ali. Shekhar and his team interrogate him, but learn nothing, where they decide to bring him to the court, but Ali dies on the way, where his phone receives a message, which displays three codes. Having solved the code, Shekhar and his team learn that the codes describe a bomb placed in Charminar and set to explode at 8:00 AM, in just a few hours, and also learns in the investigation, that the opposition leader of the state, Pratap Reddy, is going on a rally against the current government, and they conclude that the bomb is placed to kill Reddy. 

Shekhar finds the bomb in an underhole and immediately informs the bomb squad, but they inform him that it is a remote-controlled bomb and that the remote must be used to detonate the bomb, in the vicinity. Shekhar searches for the remote, but to no avail. After Shekhar captures a suspicious man, the latter reveals that the remote is in a white colored-van, being operated by the terrorists. He shoots at the van with the other police officers and kills them. Shekhar finds Niranjan in the crowd, and chases after him, where he successfully arrests him. After arresting him, Shekhar's senior officer is informed by the government that Shekhar has been assigned to transfer Niranjan to Nagpur. 

When Shekhar and Niranjan move to Nagpur, a gang attacks them, which forces their van into the river and shoot at them. Shekhar saves Niranjan and leaves towards the forest, where Niranjan reveals that the success of Pokhran Fire testing in 1998 made India to keep its uranium reserves protected from other countries, for future use. The head of the Atomic Department of India, hired four hackers, which include Niranjan, Vishal and two other people, to replace the current photos of their uranium reserves with older photos, so that satellites from other countries cannot see their wealth. They successfully hacked and then left the place. However, Vishal bugged the Indian database of the DAE and learned that a uranium mine in Andhra Pradesh has the highest amount of uranium in the country. 

The head of the DAE has dealt with the MLA of the district and several other ministers, and the hackers were used to hack the satellites to cover up evidence of uranium smuggling. Niranjan took the drive and sold it to Reddy's secretary as he would expose the scandal, but Reddy made a deal with the MLA. After the revelation, Shekhar kills the mercenaries sent to kill them and manages to track the location of the main suspect George. 

Shekhar and Niranjan leave to meet George to find the data on a remote server of the DAE, but are captured. They are left tied, along with Swathi, on the remote server ship, rigged with explosives to kill them. Shekhar and Niranjan manage to escape and detach the explosives on their ship. They shoot the explosives onto George's ship, by using a leaking high pressurized steam pipe, and successfully kill him and the smugglers. The MLA and several other officers of the scandal are exposed and arrested.

Cast

Rajasekhar as Pullela Chandrashekhar "Shekhar"
Pooja Kumar as Swathi 
Adith Arun as Niranjan Iyer
Shraddha Das as Malini 
Kishore as George 
Sanjay Reddy as Ex-Intelligence Officer and Analyst
Nassar as NIA Head
Ali as Lawyer
Posani Krishna Murali as Opposition Leader Pratap Reddy
Sayaji Shinde as Mining Minister 
Srinivas Avasarala as Prakash
Charandeep as NIA Officer Venkat Rao
Ravi Varma as NIA Officer Yadav
Pruthviraj as Doctor
Shatru as Yakub Ali
Sanjay Swaroop as Ravi Naik
Aadarsh Balakrishna
Sunny Leone - special appearance in the song "Deo Deo"

Soundtrack
Bheems Ceciroleo composed the song "Deo Deo". "Premale" and the background score for the film were composed by Sricharan Pakala.

Controversy 
On 12 April 2018, Hyderabad city civil court forbade the film producers, directors, and YouTube not to screen this movie. The court has passed the interim order as a city-based uranium company filed a complaint against the film, claiming that it shows the corporation in a bad light.

References

External links
 

2010s Telugu-language films
Indian nonlinear narrative films
Indian spy thriller films
2010s spy thriller films
Films shot in Hyderabad, India
Films set in Hyderabad, India
Films about computing
Techno-thriller films
Films about security and surveillance
Films about terrorism in India
Films shot in Chennai
Fictional portrayals of the Telangana Police
Films about murder
Films about mass murder
Intelligence Bureau (India) in fiction
Films about the Research and Analysis Wing
Films scored by Sricharan Pakala
Films scored by Bheems Ceciroleo
Films directed by Praveen Sattaru